Alyce Mills (16 February 1899 – 27 April 1990) was an American actress. She appeared in silent films including as a lead. She starred in the 1924 film Daughters of the Night. and the 1926 film Say It Again. She also starred in two B. P. Schulberg films with William Powell: My Lady's Lips and Faint Perfume.

Biography
Mills was from Pittsburgh, Pennsylvania, where she attended Allegheny High School and won a beauty contest before beginning a career in film. She arrived in Los Angeles in 1925, having signed a long-term contract with Schulberg to appear in his films.

In a review of With This Ring, the Lansing State Journal wrote that Mills was "rapidly becoming established as one of the leading actresses of the younger players."

Mills married businessman William Davey in 1928. He bought her a house and they honeymooned in Honolulu, Hawaii. Mills retired from acting at the time of her marriage. The couple divorced in 1937, and Davey went on to marry actress Gloria Swanson in 1945.

Filmography

Daughters of the Night (1924), as Betty Blair, the lead part
Faint Perfume (1925), as Ledda Perrin
The Keeper of the Bees (1925), as Molly Cameron
Morals for Men (1925), as Marion Winslow 
My Lady's Lips (1925), as Dora Blake
Parisian Love (1925), as Jean D'Arcy
With This Ring (1925)
School for Wives (1925), as Mary Wilson 
Too Many Kisses (1925), as Flapper
The Prince of Broadway (1926), as Nancy Lee
Say It Again (1926), as Princess Elena
The Romance of a Million Dollars (1926), as Marie Moore
The Whirlwind of Youth (1927), as Cornelia Evans 
Two Girls Wanted (1927), as Edna Delafield

References

External links

1899 births
1990 deaths
American actors